The Zakspeed 871 was a Formula One car designed by Chris Murphy and Heinz Zollner and raced by Zakspeed in the 1987 Formula One season.

Background

Engine 

Sponsorship 
The team's main sponsor was German tobacco company West.

Drivers 
Martin Brundle had moved after 3 years at Tyrrell to be Zakspeed's lead driver, in a virtual driver swap with Jonathan Palmer, who had left Zakspeed after two seasons to drive for Tyrrell. Brundle was joined by former Formula 3000 champion Christian Danner, who had moved from Arrows.

Racing history 
After using the 861 for the first race in Brazil, the 871 made its debut in Brundle's hands at the San Marino Grand Prix where he qualified 15th and scored 2 points for finishing 5th. This happened to be the only time that Zakspeed would ever score a point during their time in Formula One.

The 871 was replaced for the  season by the team's last turbo car, the Zakspeed 881 which would be again powered by the team's own turbocharged engine.

Complete Formula One results
(key)

References

Books
 

1987 Formula One season cars
Zakspeed Formula One cars